Mauricio Martínez Aguirre (born May 20, 1975 in Colón ) is a former Panamanian bantamweight boxer .

Boxing career

In 1995 Martínez successfully started his professional career. On September 4, 2000, he boxed against Lester Fuentes for the vacant WBO world title and won by 5th round knockout. He made only one defence of his belt against Esham Pickering before losing the title to Mexican boxer Cruz Carbajal. He lost 6 of his last 7 fights and ended up retiring in 2012.

See also
List of bantamweight boxing champions

External links

1975 births
Living people
Panamanian male boxers
Bantamweight boxers
Super-bantamweight boxers
Featherweight boxers
World bantamweight boxing champions
World Boxing Organization champions